The 2004 Franklin Templeton Classic was a men's tennis tournament played on outdoor hard courts in Scottsdale, Arizona in the United States that was part of the International Series of the 2004 ATP Tour. It was the 17th edition of the tournament and was held from March 1 through March 7, 2004. Fourth-seeded Vince Spadea won the singles title.

Finals

Singles

 Vince Spadea defeated  Nicolas Kiefer 7–5, 6–7(5–7), 6–3
 It was Spadea's only singles title of his career.

Doubles

 Rick Leach /  Brian MacPhie defeated  Jeff Coetzee /  Chris Haggard 6–3, 6–1
 It was Leach's only title of the year and the 45th of his career. It was MacPhie's only title of the year and the 6th of his career.

References

External links
 ITF tournament edition details

Franklin Templeton Classic
Tennis Channel Open
 
Franklin Templeton Classic
Franklin Templeton Classic
Franklin Templeton Classic